Drag Race Holland is a Dutch reality competition streaming television series, based on the American RuPaul's Drag Race. The series is produced by Vincent TV and World of Wonder. The show premiered on Videoland in the Netherlands and on WOW Presents Plus internationally on 18 September 2020. The show documents Fred van Leer in his search for the "next Dutch drag superstar". The series was renewed for a second season in 2021, and the second season began airing on 6 August 2021.

Series overview

Episodes

Season 1 (2020)

Season 2 (2021)

References 

Drag Race Holland
Holland